Lodi Baba Mandir or Lodi Baba Dham is a Hindu temple located at Gauriganj, Amethi district Headquarters, Raibareli - Sultapur Road in Uttar Pradesh, India. This temple is dedicated to Lodi Veer Baba.

Lodi Baba temple is near the drain west of Gauriganj market, also named Lodi Nala. Famous among the local people, it is also the center of their faith. However, the place is still a rudimentary devasthan and is a reminder for the passengers of the trains coming to Gauriganj.

Transportation 
Chaudhary Charan Singh Airport, Lucknow is the nearest airport to reach Lodi Baba Mandir. Lodi Baba Mandir is on National Highway 128 (India) from Raibareli to Tanda. It is well connected by road.

See also
 Nandmahar Dham
 Ulta Gadha Dham
 Ghuisarnath Temple
 Durgan Dham Temple
 Mata Mawai Dham

References

External links

Hindu temples in Uttar Pradesh
Amethi district